The Venger: Dead Man Rising is an independent American comic book series, written and created by Matthew Spatola. The first issue featured artwork by Jason Ossman and John West. The second issue featured full art by Tim Baskin. The series is published by Ronin Studios.

Awards
In 2010 the series was nominated for an Eagle Award in the category "Favorite American Black and White Comic Book".

Notes

References

External links

Reviews

Venger: Dead Man Rising #1 - Reviews, Broken Frontier

Venger: Dead Man Rising #1 Review, Comics Bulletin, July 12, 2005